Beddow is an English surname. Notable people with the surname include:

 Clem Beddow, English footballer
 Mike Beddow, English cricketer
 Margery Beddow
 Michael Beddow
 Maurice Beddow Bayly

See also
 The Beddow Schools
 Beddow Cup

English-language surnames